Pitcairnia loki-schmidtiae is a plant species in the genus Pitcairnia. This species is endemic to Mexico.

The species is named after Hannelore "Loki" Schmidt, wife of former German chancellor Helmut Schmidt. Mrs. Schmidt discovered the species during a 1985 educational journey to Mexico.

References

loki-schmidtiae
Endemic flora of Mexico